Juniper Hill Cemetery is a historic cemetery at 24 Sherry Avenue in Bristol, Rhode Island founded by George R.Usher, James D'Wolf Perry, Byron Diman, Ambrose E. Burnside, James H. West, Charles H. R. Doringle, and Lemanuel W. Briggs.  The original  were purchased from the descendants of Levi DeWolf, a local farmer and slave hauler, in 1855, and the cemetery corporation that owns it was chartered in January 1856.  It is a fine example of the mid-19th century rural cemetery movement, with winding lanes and paths.  The landscape was designed by Niles Bierragaard Schubarth, who had done similar work at other Rhode Island cemeteries.  Its main entry is a massive stone gate built in 1876, and there is a gate house just inside, designed by Clifton A. Hall and constructed from granite quarried on site.

The cemetery was listed on the National Register of Historic Places in 1998.

Notable burials
 Benjamin Bourne, US Representative, US district and appeals judge
 William Bradford, Lt. Governor, US Senator
 Jonathan Russell Bullock, Justice of the Rhode Island Supreme Court
 Samuel Pomeroy Colt, industrialist
 LeBaron Bradford Colt, US Senator
 Byron Diman, Governor of Rhode Island
 Francis M. Dimond, Governor of Rhode Island
 Ramon Guiteras, surgeon, founder of the American Urological Association
 Gilbert C. Hoover, rear admiral, USN
 Mark Antony De Wolfe Howe, first bishop of Central Pennsylvania

See also
 National Register of Historic Places listings in Bristol County, Rhode Island

References

External links

 
 
 Politician info
 "Bristol, Rhode Island" by Richard V. Simpson (Arcadia Publishing, 1998), 30

1857 establishments in Rhode Island
Buildings and structures in Bristol, Rhode Island
Cemeteries in Rhode Island
Cemeteries on the National Register of Historic Places in Rhode Island
National Register of Historic Places in Bristol County, Rhode Island
Protected areas of Bristol County, Rhode Island